The men's competition in the –85 kg division was held on 24–25 October 2013 in Centennial Hall, Wrocław, Poland.

Schedule

Medalists

Records

 Andrei Rybakou's world record was rescinded in 2016.

Results

References

Results 
Results

2013 World Weightlifting Championships